Frank J. Gorman (June 13, 1917 – September 11, 1997) was a lawyer and member of the Ohio House of Representatives from Cuyahoga County. In 1968 he became the Democratic whip. After he left politics he became a judge in the Court of Common Pleas of Cuyahoga County.

References

Democratic Party members of the Ohio House of Representatives
1917 births
1997 deaths
20th-century American politicians